Dundas Street is a major historic arterial road in Ontario, Canada.

Dundas Street may also refer to:

 Ontario Highway 2, sections of which have been renamed "Dundas Street"
 Dundas Street, Edinburgh, a street in New Town, Edinburgh, Scotland
 Dundas Street, Hong Kong, a street between Mong Kok and Yau Ma Tei, Kowloon